Peter Baker (born 24 August 1934) is an English former footballer. He played League football as a fullback for Sheffield Wednesday and Queens Park Rangers.

Baker started his career as an amateur at Tottenham Hotspur before joining Sheffield Wednesday at the start of the 1957-58 season. During his spell at Hillsborough he made eleven league appearances and also played in one FA Cup match.

References

Living people
1934 births
Sheffield Wednesday F.C. players
Queens Park Rangers F.C. players
English footballers
Association football fullbacks